Diana Lynn Pickler (born December 9, 1983) is an American heptathlete from Shreveport, Louisiana. She has represented her country at the Olympic and World Championship levels and was the 2009 US heptathlon champion. Her twin sister, Julie Pickler, is also a track and field athlete.

Career

Spending her amateur career with Washington State University, she won her first major national honours in 2001, taking the national junior championship in the heptathlon. Track and Field News rated her as the country's top junior heptathlete that year. She represented the United States at the 2002 World Junior Championships in Athletics but finished in 15th place with 4539 points, well below her season's best of 5365.

The 2003 and 2004 seasons were uneventful but she matured as a senior athlete the following two seasons, taking sixth place in the NCAA championships in 2005 and improving to third place in 2006. She also finished fifth at the national outdoor championships that year. The 2007 season represented a significant progression: her personal best reached over 6000 points for the first time and she was ranked as the number one American heptathlete by Track and Field News. She was runner-up at the national outdoor championships, and also runner-up in the indoor championships in the pentathlon. She was part of the American team for the 2007 World Championships and, although she finished 25th, it was the best performance by an American in the event.

After taking third at the 2008 Olympic trials with a personal best of 6,257 points, she represented the United States at the 2008 Summer Olympics. However, she strained her hamstring in the first event (100 meter hurdles) and failed to finish the competition. At the 2009 national championships, an injury to the favourite Hyleas Fountain resulted in Pickler's first senior national title. She took first place with event bests in the 800 meters and shot put, and a personal heptathlon best of 6290 points, finishing ahead of Sharon Day and Bettie Wade.

Other appearances
Pickler appeared at the 7th KUNOICHI competition (known in the US as Women of Ninja Warrior) in the summer of 2007, but failed on the Log Jam in the first stage when her foot hit the water as she tried to climb back onto a log after losing her balance.

Statistics

Personal bests

All information taken from IAAF profile.

Competition record

KUNOICHI record
7th competition (99) - Failed Log Jam - First Stage

References

External links
 
 
 
 
 

1983 births
Living people
Sportspeople from Shreveport, Louisiana
American heptathletes
Washington State University alumni
Olympic track and field athletes of the United States
Athletes (track and field) at the 2008 Summer Olympics
World Athletics Championships athletes for the United States
USA Outdoor Track and Field Championships winners
USA Indoor Track and Field Championships winners
21st-century American women